Pope-Vannoy Landing is a census-designated place (CDP) in the Lake and Peninsula Borough in the U.S. state of Alaska. The population was six at the 2020 census, same amount as in 2010.

Geography
Pope-Vannoy Landing is located at  (59.537594, -154.530521), on the south side of Iliamna Lake. The CDP includes the lake inlets of Copper River Bay and Intricate Bay and extends east  up the Copper River valley.

Demographics

Pope-Vannoy Landing first appeared on the 2000 U.S. Census as a census-designated place (CDP).

As of the census of 2000, there were 8 people, 5 households, and 2 families residing in the CDP. The population density was 0.2 people per square mile (0.1/km2). There were 19 housing units at an average density of 0.4/sq mi (0.2/km2). The racial makeup of the CDP was 37.50% White, 25.00% Native American, and 37.50% from two or more races.

There were 5 households, out of which 20.0% had children under the age of 18 living with them, 20.0% were married couples living together, and 60.0% were non-families. 60.0% of all households were made up of individuals, and 20.0% had someone living alone who was 65 years of age or older. The average household size was 1.60 and the average family size was 2.50.

In the CDP, the population was spread out, with 12.5% under the age of 18, 12.5% from 18 to 24, 25.0% from 25 to 44, 37.5% from 45 to 64, and 12.5% who were 65 years of age or older. The median age was 45 years. For every 100 females, there were 300.0 males. For every 100 females age 18 and over, there were 250.0 males.

The median income for a household in the CDP was $4,583, and the median income for a family was $3,750. Males had a median income of $0 versus $0 for females. The per capita income for the CDP was $4,325. 75.0% of the population and all of the families were below the poverty line.  None of those under the age of 18 or older than 65 were living below the poverty line.

References 

Census-designated places in Alaska
Census-designated places in Lake and Peninsula Borough, Alaska